Liutprand was the king of the Lombards from 712 to 744 and is chiefly remembered for  his multiple phases of law-giving, in fifteen separate sessions from 713 to 735 inclusive, and his long reign, which brought him into a series of conflicts, mostly successful, with most of Italy. He is often regarded as the most successful Lombard monarch, notable for the Donation of Sutri in 728, which was the first accolade of sovereign territory to the Papacy.

Early life
Liutprand's life began inauspiciously.  His father was driven to exile among the Bavarians, his older brother Sigipert was blinded by Aripert II, king of the Lombards, and his mother Theodarada and sister Aurona were mutilated (their noses and ears were cut off). Liutprand was spared only because his youth made him appear harmless, described as adolescens in Paul the Deacon's Historia Langobardorum (Book VI, xxii), suggesting that he was 'probably older than 19 but still in his twenties'. He was released from Aripert II's custody and allowed to join his father.

Reign
The reign of Liutprand, son of Ansprand, duke of Asti and briefly king of the Lombards, began the day before his father's death when magnates called to Ansprand's deathbed consented to make Liutprand his colleague.  Liutprand's reign  endured for thirty-one years.  Within the Lombard kingdom he was considered a lawgiver of irreproachable Catholicity.  He was the brother of Imberg, whom he appointed ruler of Asti.

Relations with the Agilolfings of Bavaria
At the opening of his reign, Liutprand's chief ally among neighboring rulers was the Agilolfing Theodo I, the Frankish duke of Bavaria. Theodo I's intervention on Ansprand's behalf helped him gain the throne. Theodo had taken him in, when he and his father were temporarily expelled by Aripert II in 702, and the hospitality was later cemented with a marriage connection: Liutprand took to wife the Agilolfing Guntrud. The core of Theodo's policy was resistance to the Merovingian mayors of the palaces in their encroachments north of the Alps, concerns that did not much occupy Liutprand, and maintaining strategic control of the eastern Alpine passes in what is now the Italian Alps, which did. In the spring of 712, Theodo's son Theodebert, with Ansprand and Liutprand, attacked Lombard strongholds, and with the drowning of their fleeing rival Aripert, Ansprand's faction were back in power at Pavia.

Theodo died in 717 or 718; under his successor the Lombard ties with the Agilolfing weakened.  Until distracted by Byzantine politics in 726, Liutprand's chief warmaking energies were concentrated on taking Bavarian castles on the River Adige.

Byzantine wars

In his early reign, Liutprand did not attack the Exarchate of Ravenna or the Papacy.  But in 726, the Emperor Leo III made his first of many edicts outlawing images or icons (see the iconoclastic controversy).  The pope, Gregory II, ordered the people to resist and the Byzantine duke of Naples, Exhiliratus, was killed by a mob while trying to carry out the imperial command to destroy all the icons.  Liutprand chose this time of division  to strike the Byzantine possessions in Emilia.  In 727, he crossed the Po and took Bologna, Osimo, Rimini and Ancona, along with the other cities of Emilia and the Pentapolis.  He took Classis, the seaport of Ravenna, but could not take Ravenna itself from the exarch Paul.  Paul was soon killed in a riot, however.  Eventually, Ravenna would capitulate to Liutprand with barely a fight (737).

The first Umayyad raids on Corsica began around 713–719 from the Balearic Islands to the west. Acting as the protector of the Church and its faithful, Liutprand subjected the island to Lombard government (c. 725), though it was nominally under Byzantine authority. Corsica remained with the Lombard kingdom even after the Frankish conquest, by which time Lombard landholders and churches had established a significant presence on the island.

When the Saracens invaded Sardinia, Liutprand redeemed the body of Augustine about the year 720. He brought it with great ceremony to Pavia, and enshrined it in the Church of Saint Peter, which was then the cathedral of Pavia. He rescued the relics stationed on the island with great haste as well as with great expense, according to Paul the Deacon.

Donation of Sutri
Having just overwhelmed the Byzantine forces, though it was left to his heirs to make the final vestige of the Exarchate of Ravenna Lombard at last, Liutprand advanced towards Rome along the Via Cassia; he was met at the ancient city of Sutri by Pope Gregory II (728). There the two reached an agreement, by which Sutri and some hill towns in Latium (see Vetralla) were given to the Papacy, "as a gift to the blessed Apostles Peter and Paul" according to the Liber Pontificalis. They were the first extension of Papal territory beyond the confines of the Duchy of Rome. This was the beginning of the Papal States.

In the meantime, Leo sent Eutychius, as Exarch of Ravenna, to take control of Italy.  When Eutychius arrived at Naples, he made an agreement whereby Liutprand would attack the Pope if the Greeks aided him in subjugating the contumacious and independent southern Lombard duchies, the Duchy of Spoleto and the Duchy of Benevento.  The dukes, Thrasimund II and Godescalc, surrendered — though control of the duchies from Pavia was not to endure for long — and the new exarch marched on Rome. At Rome, Liutprand camped on the far bank of the Tiber in the "Field of Nero"  and arbitrated, returning to the exarch the city of Ravenna alone among the Byzantine territories and prevailing on the pope to restore his allegiance to the emperor (730).

Frankish relations
Following the death of Theodo, Liutprand turned from his former Agilolfing allies to bind himself to Charles Martel, duke of the Franks, whose son, Pepin the Short, he adopted and girded with arms at his coming of manhood. In 733 Liutprand promulgated the Notitia de actoribus regis, a series of six laws, presaging the later Frankish capitulary in structure. They sought to curb the usurpation by local administrators of public lands.

In 735–736, a serious illness encouraged Liutprand to raise his nephew Hildeprand to co-kingship.  In 736–737, Liutprand crossed the Alps with an army to help Charles expel the Moors from Aix-en-Provence and Arles.

In 738, a long peace was broken by the rebellious Lombard duke of Spoleto, Thrasimund II.  When the revolt was suppressed, with nephews of Liutprand established at Beneventum and Spoleto, the dukes fled to Rome and the protection of Pope Gregory III.  Liutprand immediately began the conquest of the Ducatus Romanus, the province around Rome.  After capturing Orte and Bomarzo, he arrived at Rome and besieged it.  The Pope sent an embassy to Charles Martel to beg for aid, promising favour then and in the future world: the cover letter survives. Gregory conferred on him the title of patrician.  Gregory's anti-Lombard rhetoric reached absurd heights considering Liutprand's orthodoxy; the Lombard king only wanted his rebellious dukes to face justice.  Charles ignored the pope's excessive charges against his erstwhile ally and instead sent back his own embassy to mediate between the two Italian powers.  Before any headway was made, however, both pope and Frank died.

Liutprandi leges
With Rothari, Liutprand is the other major Lombard figure whose legal legacy is recognized today. Liutprand's laws (Liutprandi leges) show a greater degree of Roman influence than do the laws of his predecessors.

Death

Soon after the death of Gregory III (741), Zachary was elected to the Apostolic See; Liutprand happily signed a twenty-year peace and restored the cities of the Duchy of Rome of which he had taken possession.  Soon after, his reign ended in peace.  Having passed more years on the throne and come closer to bringing the entire peninsula under one rule than any of his predecessors, the great Lombard died in 744 and was buried in the church of San Pietro in Ciel d'Oro, in Pavia.In 2018, the bones of king Liutprand were the subject of a bioarchaeological and genetic investigation. The analyzes showed that the bones belonged to three upper-class individuals, with strong muscles and who ate proteins, mainly from meat and fish, to a greater extent than the rest of the population, as evidenced by the comparisons with the bone findings. coming from some necropolis of the Lombard age found in northern Italy. Of these three individuals, two (a middle-aged man and a younger man) date back to the 6th century, while the third subject, who died around 40/50 years old, was a contemporary of Liutprando: it is therefore possible that the bones of the third individual may belong to the Lombard king.

Sources
The main source for the career of Liutprand is the Historia Langobardorum of Paul the Deacon, which idealises Liutprand. It was written after 787 and covers the story of the Lombards from 568 to the death of Liutprand in 744. Though written by a Lombard from a Lombard point of view, it contains much information about the Eastern Roman Empire, the Franks, and others.

References

Further reading
Riché, Pierre. The Carolingians : A Family who forged Europe.  M. I. Allen, translator. Philadelphia, 1993.
Neil Christie, The Lombards. The Ancient Longobards. Oxford/Cambridge: Blackwell, 1995.
Paul the Deacon, History of the Lombards. Translated by William Dudley Foulke. Philadelphia: University of Pennsylvania Press, 2003. VI.xxii; xxxv; xxxviii; xliii etc.
Cristina La Rocca (ed.), Italy in the Early Middle Ages. Oxford: Oxford University Press, 2002.
    Lexikon des Mittelalters
 Ross Balzaretti, "Masculine Authority and State Identity in Liutprandic Italy", W. Pohl and P. Erhart (eds.). Die Langobarden. Herrschaft und Identität. Forschungen zur Geschichte des Mittelalters, Österreichische Akademie der Wissenschaften (Vienna, 2005), pp. 361–382.
 Nicholas Everett, “How territorial was Lombard law?”, in W. Pohl and P. Erhart (eds.). Die Langobarden. Herrschaft und Identität. Forschungen zur Geschichte des Mittelalters, Österreichische Akademie der Wissenschaften (Vienna, 2004), pp. 347–360.  
 Nicholas Everett, "Liutprandic letters amongst the Lombards", in K. Forsyth, J. Higgitt, and D. Parsons (eds.), Roman, Runes and Ogham. Medieval Inscriptions in the Insular World and on the Continent. Papers of the International Conference on medieval Epigraphy. St Hilda’s College, Oxford, UK. July 16–17, 1996. Paul Watkins Publishers (Stamford, 2000), pp. 175–189. 
 Nicholas Everett, Literacy in Lombard Italy. Cambridge University Press 2003.

External links
Catholic Encyclopedia: "States of the Church"

680 births

Year of birth uncertain
744 deaths
8th-century Lombard monarchs
Lombard warriors
Burials at San Pietro in Ciel d'Oro
Roman Catholic monarchs